The Edge is an American sketch comedy television series created by David Mirkin that aired on the Fox Network for a single season from September 19, 1992 to May 2, 1993.

Synopsis
The series features an ensemble cast headed by comedian Julie Brown. The other cast members were Jennifer Aniston, Tom Kenny, Wayne Knight, Carol Rosenthal, James Stephens III, and Jill Talley. Other regulars of the series included Rick Overton, Paul Feig, and Alan Ruck.

The show features sketches that would revolve around original characters such as gun-toting All-American family and a cowboy known as Cracklin' Crotch. The series would also skewer pop culture. One notable episode spoofed TV sweeps by promising ratings-grabbing events such as a birth, a wedding and a death.

The series also features a running gag in which the entire cast would get killed off in various ways in each episode before the first sketch. One episode featured the cast getting hit by a bus; another had the set falling apart and crushing them; others involved explosions, decapitations, immolation, hangings, and impalement by arrows; one episode had the troupe being sucked into a vortex. In addition to sketches, Bill Plympton cartoons were used as bumpers between the sketches.

Guest appearances were made on the Illustrated Sports parody by Kim Walker and Shari Shattuck.

Cast

Main
 Julie Brown
 Jennifer Aniston
 Tom Kenny
 Wayne Knight
 Carol Rosenthal
 James Stephens III
 Jill Talley

Supporting
 Edd Hall
 Rick Overton
 Alan Ruck
 Paul Feig

Production
The show was created by David Mirkin and Julie Brown; the two were in a relationship at the time. It was developed for NBC following the failure of the pilot The Julie Show. NBC passed on the show, but it was picked up by Fox. The Edge was canceled at the end of the 1992–93 U.S. television season by Fox.

Music was provided by Steve Hampton (theme song composer), Stephen Graziano, B.C. Smith, and Christopher Tyng among others. Edd Hall provided the show's voiceovers.

Controversy
Producer Aaron Spelling threatened to sue the show over its lampoons of his TV show Beverly Hills 90210. He objected to its "completely tasteless" humor, which included an impersonation of his daughter, an actress on the show, Tori Spelling exclaiming "I can do that because it's Daddy's show." The show's production company TriStar Television refused to apologise, while Mirkin responded: "The thing about these parodies is they don't hurt a show. It's only cross-promotion. The viewers who like the show always come back the next week. What's upsetting to me is it shows absolutely that Mr. Spelling has no sense of humor."

According to the Pittsburgh Post-Gazette, executive producer Mirkin was "forced off the show" due to this negative reaction of Spelling and others. However, in 2012, Mirkin stated that he in fact left the series after refusing to accept a substantially reduced budget. The show's producers, Sony, failed to persuade him to stay, but he returned to the series to produce its final "Best Of" compilation.

Episodes

Reception
Howard Rosenberg of Los Angeles Times found The Edge to be "disappointing" and full of "mostly sophomoric sketches", though he did praise the premiere episode's closing skit noting the series "does save the best for last". Ken Tucker of Entertainment Weekly was more positive in his review of the series, calling it "edgy" and giving the show a B− grade.

Early ratings for the show were described as "respectable" by Variety.

References

External links
 
 

1990s American satirical television series
1990s American sketch comedy television series
1992 American television series debuts
1993 American television series endings
English-language television shows
Fox Broadcasting Company original programming
Television series by Sony Pictures Television
Works by Julie Brown
Television series created by David Mirkin